State Route 229 (SR 229) is a state highway in Elko County, Nevada, United States. It is a routing from Interstate 80 around Halleck, heading south through Secret Pass, to where it meets Ruby Valley Road (State Route 767). From there it heads northeast to U.S. Route 93.

History

The southeastern portion of SR 229, between the junction of SR 767 and it eastern terminus at US 93, follows the alignment of the Hastings Cutoff, a route which at the time was thought to be a more direct route of the California Trail through the northeastern part of Nevada.

Prior to 1976, SR 229 comprised a portion of State Route 11.

Major intersections

See also

 List of state highways in Nevada

References

External links

229
Transportation in Elko County, Nevada